Emiliano Zapata is a municipality in the Mexican state of Veracruz, located 2 km from Jalapa-Enríquez on Federal Highways 180 and 190. It named for the hero of the Mexican Revolution, Emiliano Zapata.

History

Geography

Adjacent municipalities 
Xalapa Municipality (northwest)
Actopan Municipality (northeast)
Puente Nacional Municipality (south)
Apazapan Municipality (south)
Jalcomulco Municipality (south)
Coatepec Municipality (west)

Major highways 
 Mexican Federal Highway 140
 Mexican Federal Highway 140D

External links 
  Municipal Official Site
  Municipal Official Information

Municipalities of Veracruz